Rave Digger is the second studio album of drum and bass DJ, producer and musician Danny Byrd. It was released through Hospital Records on 10 October 2010 digitally and on 11 October 2010 physically.

Singles
 "Sweet Harmony" was the first single released from the album, it was released on 1 February 2010. It peaked to No. 64 on the UK Singles Chart.
 "Ill Behaviour" was the second single released from the album, it was released on 26 September 2010. It peaked to No. 36 on the UK Singles Chart, making it his first top 40 single in the UK.
 "We Can Have It All" was the third single from the album. It was released on 24 October 2010.
 "Tonight" was the fourth single from the album. It was released on 6 February 2011.

Track listing

In popular media
"Judgement Day" and "We Can Have It All" appear on the Codemasters game Dirt 3. Both tracks also appear in the Turn 10 Studios game Forza Motorsport 4.

The song "Ill Behavior" appears in Codemasters' famous F1 2011 game.

Chart performance

Release history

References

2010 albums
Danny Byrd albums
Hospital Records albums